BS 5839 Part 1 Fire detection and fire alarm systems for buildings – Part 1: Code of practice for design, installation, commissioning and maintenance of systems in non-domestic premises is a standard published by the British Standards Institution. BS 5839-1:2013 supersedes BS 5839-1:2002+A2:2008, which has been withdrawn. It s the first of 9 parts in a series on national standards relating to fire alarms.

Purpose
BS 5839 Part 1 provides recommendations for the planning, design, installation, commissioning and maintenance of fire detection and fire alarm systems for non-domestic premises. Recommendations for fire detection and fire alarm systems in domestic premises are given in BS 5839-6. It does not recommend whether or not a fire detection and alarm system should be installed in any given premises, nor does it provide any exceptions for non-domestic premises which are under construction.

The term "fire detection and fire alarm systems" is a fairly wide definition, including small systems whose field devices consist only of sounders and manual call points, to complex networked systems with a large number of automatic fire detectors, manual call points and sounders, connected to numerous networked control and indicating panels.

BS 5839 Part 1 does not cover systems whose primary function is to control or extinguish fire (such as sprinklers or automatic extinguishing systems), but does cover the secondary alarm signal generated by such systems. It also does not cover voice alarm systems (which are separately addressed in BS 5839-8), or systems that integrate fire alarm functions with non fire related functions. It also does not cover manually or mechanically operated notification devices, such as hand-cranked bells.

The NHS Estates publications HTM 05-03 Part B (in England and Wales) or SHTM 82(in Scotland) provide recommendations for fire detection and fire alarm systems in hospitals.

System components should comply with the appropriate EN 54 family part, developed by British Standards Institution as BS EN 54-.

Structure 

Section 1: General
 Scope
 Normative references
 Terms and definitions
 Need for a fire detection and fire alarm system and type of system
 Categories of system
 Exchange of information and definition of responsibilities
 Variations from the recommendations of this standard

Section 2: Design considerations
 Relationship between system Category and areas protected
 Actuation of other fire protection systems or safety facilities
 Systems in explosive gas or dust atmospheres
 System components
 Monitoring, integrity and reliability of circuits external to control equipment
 Detection zones
 Alarm zones
 Communication with the fire and rescue service
 Audible alarm signals
 Visual alarm signals
 Fire alarm warnings for people with impaired hearing
 Staged fire alarms
 Manual call points
 Types of fire detector and their selection
 Spacing and siting of automatic fire detectors
 Control and indicating equipment
 Networked systems
 Power supplies
 Cables, wiring and other interconnections
 Radio-linked systems
 Electromagnetic compatibility
 Electrical safety

Section 3: Limitation of false alarms
 Responsibility for limitation of false alarms
 Categories of false alarms
 Acceptable rate of false alarms
 Causes of false alarms
 Design process for limitation of false alarms
 Measures to limit false alarms

Section 4: Installation
 Responsibility of installers
 Installation practices and workmanship
 Inspection and testing of wiring

Section 5: Commissioning and handover
 Commissioning
 Documentation
 Certification
 Acceptance
 Verification

Section 6: Maintenance
 Routine testing
 Inspection and servicing
 Non-routine attention

Section 7: User’s responsibilities
 Premises management
 Logbook

System Categories 

Fire detection and alarm systems are installed in premises in order to protect either life, property or both. Other objectives, such as the protection against business interruption or protection of the environment are likely to be met by the recommendations of BS 5839 Part 1.

BS 5839 Part 1  categorises fire alarm systems as:

 "M" - manual system (no automatic fire detectors so the building is fitted with call points and sounders),
 "L" - automatic systems intended for the protection of life, and
 "P" - automatic systems intended for the protection of property.

Categories for automatic systems are further subdivided into L1 to L5, and P1 to P2:

 "L5" - systems designed to satisfy a specific fire safety objective (other than that of a Category L1, L2, L3 or L4 system).
 "L4" - installed within escape routes comprising, such as corridors and stairways.
 "L3" - as "L4", plus automatic detection to rooms which open onto an escape route.
 "L2" - as "L3, plus automatic detection installed in defined parts of the building.
 "L1" - systems installed throughout all areas of the building.
 "P2" - systems installed only in defined parts of the premises.
 "P1" - systems installed throughout the premises.

No recommendations are made in BS 5839 Part 1 as to which (if any) category to specify for any given premises (although it does include examples of typical categories of typical buildings in Annex A). System category recommendations can be found in BS 9999.

Part 9
BS 5839-9:2011, Fire detection and fire alarm systems for buildings. Code of practice for the design, installation, commissioning and maintenance of emergency voice communication systems, part 9 in the series of national standards, covers the design, installation and maintenance of emergency voice communication systems where they form part of a fire safety strategy. The 2011 version replaced an earlier 2003 version and reflects more recent regulatory and legislative requirements for building evacuation, including for people with a disability.

References

External links
BSI Group

5839
Electrical safety in the United Kingdom
Electrical standards
Safety codes
Safety organizations